
Josephine Wilson is an Australian writer and academic based in Perth, Western Australia.

Biography
Wilson was born in Lincolnshire, England, and came to live in Australia with her family at the age of six. She has a Masters of Philosophy from the University of Queensland and a PhD from University of Western Australia (UWA). 

She writes essays, poetry and fiction.

In September 2017, Wilson won the Miles Franklin Award for her second novel, Extinctions (UWA Publishing, 2016).  This book had won the inaugural Dorothy Hewett Award for an unpublished manuscript in 2016. It also won the 2017 Colin Roderick Award, and was shortlisted for the 2017 Prime Minister's Literary Awards.

Wilson lives in Perth and teaches creative writing and literary theory at Murdoch University. She has been a sessional teacher at UWA and Curtin University, lecturing in performance studies, creative writing, and the history of art and design.

Wilson was a writer-in-residence at Yaddo in Saratoga Springs (2019), and an Asialink resident in Shanghai (2018).

Bibliography

Plays
The Geography of Haunted Places (1994) in Allen, Richard and Pearlman, Karen Performing the Unnameable, Sydney: Currency Press. 
Customs (1998)

Novels
 Cusp, UWA Publishing (2005)
 Extinctions, UWAP (2016)

References

Year of birth missing (living people)
Living people
Australian women novelists
Academic staff of Curtin University
English emigrants to Australia
Writers from Perth, Western Australia
Miles Franklin Award winners
University of Western Australia alumni